Hugh Alexander Ambrose (August 12, 1966 – May 23, 2015) was an American historian and the author of a best-selling popular history of the Pacific Theater in World War II.  Ambrose rose to prominence as a researcher for and collaborator with his father, historian Stephen E. Ambrose.

Education
Ambrose received his undergraduate and graduate degrees from the University of Montana.

Academic career
Ambrose collaborated with his father on the book The Pacific. Following the elder Ambrose's death from cancer in 2002, Hugh Ambrose finished the book and served as a project consultant on the television series of the same name.

Ambrose was also a former vice president of The National WWII Museum.

Public service
He was a trustee for the Lewis and Clark Library in Helena.  He served on the board of the Myrna Loy Center for the Performing and Media Arts also in Helena.

Personal life
With his family, he was a resident of Helena, Montana.  He died in Helena of cancer at age 48. He was survived by his wife, a son and a daughter.

References

External links
Ambrose discusses The Pacific

1966 births
2015 deaths
Historians of World War II
Deaths from cancer in Montana
20th-century American historians
University of Montana alumni
20th-century American male writers
21st-century American historians
21st-century American male writers
American male non-fiction writers
Writers from Baltimore
Historians from Maryland
People from Helena, Montana
Historians from Montana